The Diocese of Chartres (Latin: Dioecesis Carnutensis; French: Diocèse de Chartres) is a Latin Church ecclesiastical territory or diocese of the Catholic Church in France.  

The diocese is a suffragan in the ecclesiastical province of the metropolitan Archdiocese of Tours.

History
Adventus is listed as the first bishop. Solemnis was instrumental in the conversion of Clovis. In 911, Bishop Gauscelinus used the Voile de la Vierge (Veil of the Blessed Virgin), as a standard when warding off the invading Normans. Fulbert was responsible for the advancement of the Nativity of the Virgin's feast day on September 8. Ivo of Chartres and John of Salisbury were notable bishops.

The Cathédrale Notre-Dame de Chartres was constructed between 1194 and 1220, on the site of at least five cathedrals that have occupied the site since the Diocese of Chartres was formed as an episcopal see in the 4th century.

In 1697, the Diocese of Blois was erected from the territory of Chartres. It 1802, the Diocese of Chartres was suppressed, and the area placed under the newly created Diocese of Versailles. However, in 1822, the See of Chartres was re-established and made suffragan at that time to the Archbishopric of Paris.

Pilgrimages

Chartres has been a site of Christian pilgrimage since the Middle Ages. Louis IX of France made a pilgrimage; as did Philip IV and Charles IV.

The poet Charles Péguy (1873–1914) revived the pilgrimage route between Paris and Chartres before the First World War. After the war, some students carried on the pilgrimage in his memory. Since the 1980s, the association Notre-Dame de Chrétienté, with offices in Versailles, has organized the annual 100-km pilgrimage on foot from the cathedral of Notre-Dame de Paris to the cathedral of Notre-Dame de Chartres. About 15,000 pilgrims, mostly young families from all over France, participate every year.

Bishops

See also
Catholic Church in France

References

Bibliography

Reference works
  (Use with caution; obsolete)
  (in Latin) 
 (in Latin)

Studies

Roman Catholic dioceses in France
Diocese
Chartres Cathedral